The Malls at Oriental Plaza is a shopping mall on Wangfujing in Beijing, China. It has 3 levels and over 300 stores.

References

Dongcheng District, Beijing
Shopping malls in Beijing